Gospel Nights is a 1980 live album by Maria Muldaur released on Takoma Records. The album features guest artists, and friends of Muldaur, The Chambers Brothers, The Burns Sisters, and backed by The Alpha Band members David Mansfield, Steven Soles, and Stephen Bruton. The liner notes, written by T Bone Burnett.

Track listing
 My Sisters And Brothers
 My Jesus Is All
 Trials, Troubles, Tribulations
 Bright Morning Star
 Daniel Prayed
 Nobody's Fault But Mine
 As An Eagle Stireth Her Nest
 Did You Remember To Pray
 Traveling Shoes
 People Get Ready
 Said I Wasn't Gonna Tell No One
 Guide Me, O Thou Great Jehova

Personnel 

Maria Muldaur – co-producer
Jon Monday - co-producer
Maria Muldaur - vocals
The Chambers Brothers – vocals

References

External links
Maria Muldaur's Official Site - listing discography

1980 live albums
Maria Muldaur albums